The Predator is the third EP by American metalcore band Ice Nine Kills and was self-released by the band on January 15, 2013. The EP debuted at No. 9 on the Billboard Heatseekers chart.

It is the only album to feature Steve Koch as bassist and backup singer after his departure in 2013, and the last album to feature Justin Morrow as rhythm guitarist; he would switch to bass guitar and backing vocals (on live performance only) while still playing rhythm guitar in studio in 2013.

The tracks "The Coffin Is Moving" and "What I Never Learned in Study Hall" later would be featured on the band's 2014 album The Predator Becomes the Prey.

The track "What I Never Learned in Study Hall" was later re-recorded acoustically for Take Action. Vol. 11 making it similar to the song's predecessors "What I Really Learned in Study Hall" and "What I Should Have Learned in Study Hall". Unlike the original version, the acoustic version did not feature Tyler Carter as guest vocalist, but instead featured former Kid's Jackson Summer vocalist Kate Ellen Dean.

Track listing

Personnel 
 Spencer Charnas - lead vocals, piano on "A Reptile's Dysfunction"
 Justin "JD" DeBlieck - lead guitar, lead vocals
 Justin Morrow - rhythm guitar
 Steve Koch - bass guitar, backing vocals
 Connor Sullivan - drums
 Steve Sopchak - producer, engineer, mixing

Charts

References

2013 EPs
Ice Nine Kills EPs
Self-released EPs